The Arena Omsk was a 10,318-seat multi-purpose arena in Omsk, Russia. It opened in 2007, replacing  Sports-Concerts Complex Viktora Blinova as the home of Kontinental Hockey League ice hockey team, Avangard Omsk.

Construction and opening

After the arena was designed by Austrian company AMR the construction began on March 16, 2004. On August 31, 2007, the first ice hockey game was played as a part of the 2007 Super Series, a junior hockey challenge between Canada and Russia.

The original owner of the arena was Roman Abramovich, however in 2012 he donated it to Avangard Omsk.

In 2018, the arena was found to be structurally deficient, and had to be demolished. The demolition is completed in September 2019. A new arena will be built at its place and is planning to open in September 2022 for the opening of the KHL 2022–23 season.

Events
2007 Super Series
2011–2013 World Junior Club Cup
2012 Gagarin Cup Finals

See also
 List of European ice hockey arenas
 List of Kontinental Hockey League arenas

References

External links

 Profile on the site of HC Avangard
 Photos of new arena

Indoor ice hockey venues in Russia
Indoor arenas in Russia
Music venues in Russia
Sport in Omsk
Avangard Omsk
Buildings and structures in Omsk Oblast
Kontinental Hockey League venues